Megacraspedus attritellus is a moth of the family Gelechiidae. It is found in Russia (Lower Volga, southern Ural) and possibly Turkey.

The ground colour of the forewings is white, the costal, dorsal and apical areas with brown-tipped scales. The hindwings are pale fuscous.

References

Moths described in 1871
Megacraspedus
Insects of Turkey